Gladiaattorit is a Finnish competition television program part of the international Gladiators franchise.

Original series
The show originally ran for three seasons from 1993 to 1994; it was directed by Hollywood director Renny Harlin, produced by Markus Selin, and filmed at Planet FunFun. It was hosted by Juha-Pekka Jalo alongside Katariina Ebeling in 1993 and Minna Aaltonen in 1994.

It was rerun on the original MTV3 channel in 2002.

Participants
Persons becoming famous from the show included Tony Halme (Viikinki—Gladiator Viking) who would become a member of the parliament and Virpi Butt (Timantti—Gladiator Diamond) who committed a murder in 2003.

Competitors Pirjo Litilia, Riikka Hartikainen, Jarmo Jousisto, and Tommi Vuoristo would later compete on International Gladiators 1. Gladiators Flash (Salama—Marjo Krishi) and Terminator (Terminaattori — Mikko Tukonen) would also appear on IG1.

Revivals
On 6 April 2017, it was announced that the show, owned by MGM Television, will return to the airwaves in Finland for a revival on Nelonen. The new series will be hosted by Heikki Paasonen and recorded at Tampere Exhibition and Sports Centre.

It was announced that in 2019 a new series of Gladiaattorit would return to its original television channel MTV3. The relaunched series will be hosted by Viivi Pumpanen and Antero Mertaranta. Filming of the series began on 11 February 2019 and will be produced by MTV Warner Bros. International Television Production Finland. There will be seven new Gladiators joining the team, with six staying from the previous series in 2017. Legendary original Gladiator Mohikaani (Mika Ounaskari) is joining the show as the Gladiators coach and event expert.

Events

Gladiators

References

External links
 
 GladiatorsTV.com - Finland

1993 Finnish television series debuts
1994 Finnish television series endings
Gladiators (franchise)
Finnish game shows
MTV3 original programming
Nelonen original programming
Finnish non-fiction television series